Ellis v Lambeth LBC is an English land law case regarding adverse possession. which received significant media attention

Facts
Mr Ellis began occupying a house on Strathleven Road, Brixton, owned by Lambeth LBC in July 1985, alongside other squatters. Four years later, he began exercising control over access to the property. The same year, Lambeth LBC sent a registration form to Mr Ellis regarding Poll Tax. After the court held at first instance Mr Ellis had acquired the property through adverse possession, the council appealed on the ground that his failure to return the form constituted an interruption (by representing he was not residing at the property) to the 12 years of occupation necessary to make a claim of adverse possession.

Judgment
In dismissing Lambeth LBC's appeal, Wilson J upheld Mr Ellis' claim for adverse possession, confirming it met all the requirements under the Limitation Act 1980 (as found by the recorder). He dismissed the council's claim that failing to respond to a community charge form amounted to estoppel by representation and thus had not continuously occupied the property for the requisite 12 year period. His failure to return the form was held not hide his possession of the property and detriment for the estoppel claim could not be established on the facts. Furthermore, Lambeth LBC were aware of the squatting. The case also confirmed that property occupied with other squatters still constitutes exclusive possession when determining an adverse possession claim.

In the Media 
Due to Mr Ellis' successful adverse possession claim and thus being awarded with freehold title of the property, his case attracted significant media attention highlighting the contention around squatting and adverse possession. An article published by BBC News reported the anger of neighbours at the decision and how the council was branded 'incompetent' by the judge at first instance. The Guardian described the fears over other 'copycat' attempts of adverse possession, as well as Mr Ellis' neighbours' "grudging admiration" for his method of acquiring the house

See also

Notable adverse possession cases (England and Wales) 
 Buckinghamshire CC v Moran [1990] Ch 623
 Dyer v Terry [2013] EWHC 4829 (Ch)
 Heaney v Kirkby [2015] UKUT 0178
 Red House Farms v Catchpole [1977] 2 EGLR 125
 Powell v McFarlane (1977) 38 P&CR 452
 Hounslow v Minchinton (1997) 74 P&CR 221
 Ellett-Brown v Tallishire Ltd [1990] 3 WLUK 430
 Carroll v Manek and Bank of India (2000) 79 P&CR 173

References 

1999 in case law
1999 in British law
Court of Appeal (England and Wales) cases